Saint Philaretos lived sometime in the early 8th century. Born in Paphlagonia, Philaretos was very rich and belonged to an illustrious local aristocratic family of Byzantine Anatolian magnates. According to the hagiography written by his grandson Niketas, Philaretos possessed unworldly generosity and gave away most of his wealth. It depicts Philaretos as a fool for Christ. 

The hagiography is also noteworthy for those studying the period. The lands of Paphlagonia, for example, are described as having been raided by the "Ishmaelites", attesting to the success of Islamic raids into Byzantine territory, as Paphlagonia is within a few days' ride of Constantinople.

Furthermore, the work reveals the possible political undertones of Philaretos's canonization. Becoming a saint at the time required substantial investments, including a cult, churches built throughout imperial territory and a sustained endowment to continually petition the Church and Bishop synods to grant sainthood. Some historians have suggested that Niketas wrote the hagiography in order to legitimize the family and increase its prestige. Maria of Amnia, Philaretos's granddaughter, had married Emperor Constantine VI of the Byzantine Empire largely at the insistence of his powerful mother Empress Irene in the first recorded bride-show. The bride-show might have been an attempt by Irene to marry her son to a girl with no substantial connections and thus to reduce his power. Empress Irene relentlessly maintained her power even as her son matured and the regency ended. In fact, the hagiography by Niketas refers to the Empress Irene as "Basileus" Irene, using the masculine form of the Greek word meaning 'emperor' to indicate her powerful role.

After Constantine VI succeeded in wresting power from his mother, he also divorced Maria. Thus, the work of Niketas might be seen as an attempt to shore up the family's ancestry with a holy and respected figure in order to confer prestige and legitimacy in the aftermath of the divorce.

References 

Rydén, Lennart, and Nicetas. The Life of St Philaretos the Merciful Written by His Grandson Niketas: A Critical Edition with Introduction, Translation, Notes, and Indices. Uppsala: Uppsala University Library, 2002. Print.

Saints from Anatolia
8th-century Christian saints